Dahlella caldariensis is a species of leptostracan crustacean which lives on hydrothermal vents in the Pacific Ocean.

Description
Much of the animal is covered by a large, hinged carapace.
Dahlella can be distinguished from other animals in the same family by the presence of a row of denticles (small teeth) on the eyestalks, which it is believed are used to scrape surfaces for food. A similar character is found in Paranebalia (Paranebaliidae), but the form of the eyestalk is very different in the two taxa.

Distribution
D. caldariensis has been recorded from a small number of sites around hydrothermal vents in the eastern Pacific Ocean near the Galápagos Islands and on the East Pacific Rise.

Etymology
The generic name Dahlella commemorates the biologist Erik Dahl of the University of Lund. The specific epithet comes from the Latin word  meaning hot bath, and is a reference to the natural habitat of D. caldariensis.

References

Leptostraca
Organisms living on hydrothermal vents
Animals living on hydrothermal vents
Monotypic crustacean genera
Crustaceans described in 1984